Dad, I'm Sorry ("Old Father") is a 2021 Vietnamese comedy-drama film produced by Trấn Thành and HKFilm Galaxy Studio directed by Trấn Thành and Vũ Ngọc Đãng, based on the web series of the same name. It stars Ngọc Giàu, Tuấn Trần, Ngân Chi, Lê Giang, Hoàng Mèo, Lan Phương, La Thành, Lê Trang, Quốc Khánh, A Quay và Bảo Phúc. 

Dad, I'm Sorry is scheduled to be released in the Vietnam on March 12, 2021. It was previously set for release on Lunar New Year (February 12, 2021), but was postponed due to the outbreak of COVID-19. It was selected as the Vietnamese entry for the Best International Feature Film at the 94th Academy Awards.

Cast

Release 
Dad, I'm Sorry was scheduled to be released in the Vietnam on February 12, 2021; however, because of the COVID-19 epidemic's severity in Hai Duong and some other localities, it was postponed. On February 24, Tran Thanh announced the film's new premiere schedule on March 12, around the same time as Bao Nhan and Nam Cito's Gái già lắm chiêu V. The film had its press and media premiere on the afternoon of March 4, and had early screenings from March 5 to March 8, 2021.

Reception

Box office 
After two days of sale, by the evening of March 3, 2021, Dad, I'm Sorry sold nearly 12,000 tickets, earning more than VND 1.2 billion. By noon on March 4, according to Tran Thanh's announcement, the total revenue from pre-booked tickets was nearly VND 2 billion. On the first day of early screening (from 18:00 on March 5), the film had more than 1,200 screenings – the highest number of early screenings after 18 hours for a Vietnamese film – with nearly 37,000 tickets sold, earning an additional 3.6 billion, thereby raising the total revenue to nearly VND 6 billion (Box Office Vietnam). On the afternoon of March 6, the release announced that the film had collected VND 10.6 billion within the first 6 hours of early screening, becoming the second highest-earning early-release film in Vietnam after Avengers: End game.

As of the morning of March 7, 2021, according to Box Office Vietnam, the total box office revenue of Dad, I'm Sorry is more than VND 33.8 billion. With nearly 7,000 screenings from March 5th to March 8th, more than Gái già lắm chiêu V, the film is expected to soon reach over VND 100 billion in revenue.

See also
 List of submissions to the 94th Academy Awards for Best International Feature Film
 List of Vietnamese submissions for the Academy Award for Best International Feature Film

References

External links
 
 Trailer on YouTube

2021 films
2021 comedy-drama films
Vietnamese comedy-drama films